The Essex Serpent is a 2022 British gothic romance period drama miniseries based on  the novel of the same name by Sarah Perry. The series is written by Anna Symon, directed by Clio Barnard, and stars Claire Danes and Tom Hiddleston in lead roles. It premiered on Apple TV+ on 13 May 2022.

Premise 
The Essex Serpent follows London widow Cora Seaborne (Claire Danes) who moves to Essex to investigate reports of a mythical serpent. She forms a surprising bond of science and skepticism with the local pastor (Tom Hiddleston), but when tragedy strikes, locals accuse her of attracting the creature.

Cast and characters 
 Claire Danes as Cora Seaborne
 Tom Hiddleston as Will Ransome
 Frank Dillane as Luke Garrett
 Clémence Poésy as Stella Ransome
 Hayley Squires as Martha
 Jamael Westman as Dr. George Spencer
 Lily-Rose Aslandogdu as Naomi Banks
 Gerard Kearns as Henry Banks
 Michael Jibson as Matthew Evansford
 Caspar Griffiths as Frankie Seaborne
 Dixie Egerickx as Jo Ransome
 Ryan Reffell as John Ransome
 Nitin Ganatra as Sir Charles Ambrose
 Christopher Fairbank as Cracknell
 Deepica Stephen as Sali
 Yaamin Chowdhury as Nev
 Greta Bellamacina as surgeon

Episodes

Production

Development
In August 2020, it was reported that Apple gave a straight-to-series order for The Essex Serpent to See-Saw Films.

Casting
When The Essex Serpent was announced in August 2020, Keira Knightley was set to play the leading role of Cora as well as executive produce, however in October 2020, she chose to leave the project due to "family reasons". In February 2021, Claire Danes signed on to play Cora to replace Knightley. Tom Hiddleston joined the cast the following month. In April, Frank Dillane, Hayley Squires, Clémence Poésy and Jamael Westman would be added to the main cast.

Filming
Filming was previously set to begin in late November 2020 before Knightley exited the series. Filming for The Essex Serpent began in February 2021, in a number of Essex locations, including Alresford, Brightlingsea, North Fambridge and Maldon, as well as across London, including Gordon Square in Bloomsbury. Filming for the series concluded on the week of 27 June 2021.

Reception
The review aggregator website Rotten Tomatoes reported a 76% approval rating with an average rating of 7.1/10, based on 41 critic reviews. The website's critics' consensus reads, "Distinguished by biting performances and coiling ambience, The Essex Serpent is a highly accomplished Gothic romance." Metacritic, which uses a weighted average, has a score of 69 out of 100 based on 19 critics, indicating "generally favorable reviews".

The miniseries was nominated for two Royal Television Society Craft & Design Awards, for outstanding achievement in Design - Titles, and Production Management.

References

External links
 

2022 British television series debuts
2022 British television series endings
2020s British drama television series
2020s British television miniseries
English-language television shows
Apple TV+ original programming
Television shows based on British novels
Television shows filmed in England
Television shows set in Essex